Eurotamandua ("european Tamandua") is an extinct genus of mammal from extinct family Eurotamanduidae that lived some 40-35 million years ago, during the middle Eocene.

A single fossil is known, coming from the Messel Pit in southwestern Germany. Most palaeontologists now classify Eurotamandua as a pangolin. When its fossils were first discovered, Eurotamandua was originally thought to be an anteater, as it lacked the characteristic fused-hair scales of other pangolins. Eurotamandua placement within the pangolins was made primarily because of a lack of the characteristic "xenarthran" joints found in all xenarthrans, including tamanduas.

There is still much ambiguity in the taxonomy of all mammals prior to the Eocene, so there is the possibility that Eurotamandua was a primitive xenarthran. However, this is highly unlikely because all known fossil evidence indicates that xenarthrans existed exclusively in South America from the beginning of the Cenozoic era until the formation of the Panama land bridge 3 million years ago, after which they spread to North America (but never to Eurasia or Africa). Another possibility is that Eurotamandua belongs to another groups of mammals which appeared around its time, the Afredentata (probably part of Afrotheria). Eurotamandua is currently thought to be a stem-pangolin, closer to crown pangolins than Palaeanodonta and Euromanis but more basal than Eomanis and Necromanis.

Paleobiology
Eurotamandua bears characteristics found in almost all ant-eating mammals: long claws, an elongated snout, and most likely the same long, sticky tongue. These features led Eurotamandua to be initially misclassified as a xenarthran anteater, which was common for many ant-eating mammals prior to the 20th century. Presumably it also fed on ants and termites. The generic name comments on the strong, albeit possibly superficial resemblance to modern arboreal anteaters of the genus Tamandua, especially with its long, prehensile tail.

Phylogeny
Phylogenetic position of genus Eurotamandua within order Pholidota.

References

External links
 Online discussion of Eurotamandua relations 
 Photo of fossil 

Eocene mammals of Europe
Myrmecophagous mammals
Prehistoric pangolins
Prehistoric placental genera
Fossil taxa described in 1981